High Noon, Part II: The Return of Will Kane is a 1980 American Western television film and a sequel to the classic 1952 film High Noon. It starred Lee Majors in the title role, as well as David Carradine and Pernell Roberts. It first aired on CBS on November 15, 1980, in a two-hour time-slot. The film's screenplay was written by novelist Elmore Leonard.

Plot

Will Kane, now a private citizen living happily with his family, returns to the town of Hadleyville one year after the events of High Noon to conduct some business. He finds that the town is now in the hands of J.D. Ward, a corrupt marshal who allows his deputies to abuse and terrorize the citizens. Ward even shows his contempt for Kane by shooting the horses he purchased knowing that Kane can do nothing about it. Kane learns that Ward has organized a manhunt for outlaw Ben Irons and his men to collect the large bounty on their heads, despite the fact that none of them have committed any crimes and he is therefore acting outside of his authority as marshal. Kane, disgusted by Ward's actions and sharing a small friendship with Irons that dates back to his time as marshal, decides to help him escape from the law. Despite his efforts, Irons is shot and killed. Ward attempts to have Kane arrested for aiding a fugitive, but the townspeople turn on him and the local authorities, despite previously ignoring Ward's abuses, reinstate Kane as marshal and give him a warrant to jail Ward. Kane is given the old marshal's star he threw away at the end of the first movie, and kills Ward when he resists arrest. The movie ends with Kane sharing a tender moment with his wife and surrounded by the townspeople, finally grateful for all he's done for them.

Cast
Lee Majors as Will Kane
David Carradine as Ben Irons
Pernell Roberts as Marshal J.D. Ward
Katherine Cannon as Amy Kane
Michael Pataki as Darold
M. Emmet Walsh as Harold Patton
Frank Campanella as Dr. Losey
J.A. Preston as Alonzo
Tracey Walter as Harlan Tyler 
Britt Leach as Virgil

Home media
High Noon, Part II: The Return of Will Kane was released on DVD in 2012.

References

External links
 
 Stagecoach to tombstone: the filmgoers' guide to the great westerns, by Howard Hughes

1980 television films
1980 Western (genre) films
American Western (genre) television films
American sequel films
Television sequel films
Color sequels of black-and-white films
Films directed by Jerry Jameson
1980s English-language films